Ilona is a 1921 German silent film directed by Robert Dinesen and starring Lya De Putti, Arnold Korff and Artúr Somlay.

The film's sets were designed by the Hungarian art director Stefan Lhotka.

Cast
 Lya De Putti as Ruschka & Ilona  
 Arnold Korff as Count Balogh  
 Artúr Somlay as Baron Ernö von Mezy  
 H. Thorsten as Baron Géza Erdély  
 Oswald Delmor as Bator, Stallmeister des Grafen  
 Harald Paulsen as Imre  
 Georg Rauscher as Jozsi  
 Adolf Klein as Bischof  
 Maria Wefers as Ethelka, Ernös Freundin  
 Albert Patry

References

Bibliography
 Bock, Hans-Michael & Bergfelder, Tim. The Concise CineGraph. Encyclopedia of German Cinema. Berghahn Books, 2009.

External links

1921 films
Films of the Weimar Republic
Films directed by Robert Dinesen
German silent feature films
UFA GmbH films
Films produced by Joe May
German black-and-white films